Madison is a town in the southeastern corner of New Haven County, Connecticut, United States, occupying a central location on Connecticut's Long Island Sound shoreline. The population was 17,691 at the 2020 census.

History
Madison was first settled in 1641. Throughout the 18th century, Madison was known as East Guilford until it was incorporated as a town in 1826. The present name is after James Madison, 4th President of the United States.

From 1935 to 1942, Madison served as the site of Camp Hadley, one of 23 Civilian Conservation Corps (CCC) camps in Connecticut.

Geography
According to the United States Census Bureau, the town has a total area of 36.8 square miles (95.3 km), of which 36.2 square miles (93.8 km) is land and 0.6 square miles (1.5 km), or 1.6%, is water. Madison is bordered by the municipalities of Clinton and Killingworth to the east, Durham to the north, Guilford to the west, and Long Island Sound to the south.

Principal communities
East River
Hammonasset Point
Madison Center - a census-designated place, with a population of 2,290 at the 2010 census. It is the main area for businesses and the location of the library and Madison Green Historic District.
North Madison
Rockland

Demographics

As of the 2000 census, there were 17,858 people, 6,515 households, and 5,120 families residing in the town. The racial makeup of the town was 96.62% White, 0.40% African American, 0.06% Native American, 1.71% Asian, 0.01% Pacific Islander, 0.25% from other races, and 0.94% from two or more races. Hispanic or Latino of any race were 1.34% of the population.

There were 6,515 households, out of which 39.1% had children under the age of 18 living with them, 69.8% were married couples living together, 6.6% had a female householder with no husband present, and 21.4% were non-families. 18.5% of all households were made up of individuals, and 8.5% had someone living alone who was 65 years of age or older. The average household size was 2.72 and the average family size was 3.12.

The town's population was distributed with 28.2% under the age of 18, 3.8% from 18 to 24, 25.3% from 25 to 44, 28.6% from 45 to 64, and 14.1% who were 65 years of age or older. The median age was 41 years. For every 100 females, there were 93.2 males. For every 100 females age 18 and over, there were 89.8 males.

The median income for a household in the town was $87,437, and the median income for a family was $101,297. Males had a median income of $73,525 versus $41,058 for females. The per capita income for the town was $40,537. About 0.9% of families and 1.3% of the population were below the poverty line, including 0.5% of those under age 18 and 2.4% of those age 65 or over.

Arts and culture

Library
The E.C. Scranton Memorial Library was built in 1901, and was designed by architect Henry Bacon. The library was expanded in 1989.

National Register of Historic Places listings

Allis-Bushnell House, added February 25, 1982
Deacon John Grave House, added June 28, 1982
Hammonasset Paper Mill Site, added February 23, 1996
Madison Green Historic District, added June 28, 1982
Meigs-Bishop House, added June 16, 1988
Jonathan Murray House, added April 12, 1982
Shelley House, added February 9, 1989
State Park Supply Yard, added September 4, 1986

Parks and recreation

Beaches
Hammonasset Beach State Park contains the state's longest public beach, with campsites, picnic areas, and a fishing pier.  Beaches included Surf Club Beach, East Wharf, and West Wharf. The Madison Beach Club is located there.

Government

Madison was once overwhelmingly Republican in federal elections. In 1924, a strong year for the GOP, town voters gave 85.83% to Republican Calvin Coolidge. The town voted against Franklin Delano Roosevelt in each of his successful campaigns.

Even in 1964, a strong Democratic year, the town gave Barry Goldwater 1,605 votes against Lyndon Johnson with 1,470 votes.

However, Madison residents have delivered Democratic wins in recent years. In the 2008 presidential election, Democrat Barack Obama received 55.78% of the vote in Madison, winning against Republican John McCain with 43.25%. In 2016, voters gave Democrat Hillary Clinton 54.5% of the vote, while Republican opponent Donald Trump won 41.3% In 2020, voters gave Democrat Joe Biden 53% of the vote, while Republican Donald Trump received only 37.3%.

Education
Madison Public Schools serve grades K–12 and include Ryerson Elementary School, Jeffery Elementary School, Brown Middle School, Polson Middle School, and Daniel Hand High School.

Private elementary schools in Madison include Our Lady of Mercy Preparatory Academy, The Country School, and Grove School.

Infrastructure

Transportation
Major roads in Madison include Interstate 95, U.S. Route 1, and state highway Routes 79 and 80.

The Madison train station is served by the Shore Line East commuter railroad, with service to New Haven's Union Station to the west and the Old Saybrook train station to the east, facilitating connections to the MTA's Metro-North Railroad and to Amtrak's Northeast Regional and Acela Express services.

9 Town Transit routes 641 and 645 provide public bus service between Madison Center and Old Saybrook and Middletown, respectively, along U.S. Route 1. From June 20, 2021, to September 6, 2021, 9 Town Transit also operated the Madison Shuttle, providing service between Madison Park and Ride and Hammonasset Beach. CT Transit's route 201 bus connects Madison Center to New Haven.

From 1931 to 2007, Madison was served by Griswold Airport.

Notable people

 Jill Abramson, former executive editor of The New York Times
 Brad Anderson (born 1964), film director
 Jack Beebe (1925–2015), NASCAR team owner
 Sally Benson, writer of Meet Me in St. Louis
 Elizabeth Bentley, Soviet spy
 Mac Bohonnon, Olympic skier
 John Brent (1938–1985), comedian
 Cornelius Bushnell, financier for the ironclad ship USS Monitor and a railroad pioneer and investor
 Jim Calhoun (born 1942), head coach of 3-time NCAA champion Connecticut Huskies men's basketball team
 Thomas Chittenden, founder of independent Vermont Republic and first Governor of the state of Vermont
 Douglas Clayton, global frontier investment pioneer
 Ranulf Compton (1878–1974), congressman
 Duo Dickinson (born 1955), architect
 Zachary Donohue, figure skater
 Jack Driscoll (born 1997), NFL player for the Philadelphia Eagles
 Frank Duryea, inventor and builder of first American gasoline-powered automobile
 Peter Hastings Falk, expert on American art
 David Dudley Field I (1781–1867), Congregational clergyman
 John Gunther, author of Death Be Not Proud and Inside Europe
 Arnold Jackson, Olympic track gold medalist and World War I brigadier general in British army
 Edwin D. Kilbourne, developer of influenza vaccines
 Charles Kullman, tenor with Metropolitan Opera
 Kiley McKinnon (born 1995), world champion skier
 Rob Moroso, NASCAR driver
 John-Michael Parker, member of the Connecticut House of Representatives
 Westbrook Pegler, journalist, anti-New Deal columnist
 Jacques Pépin, celebrity chef
 Joseph A. Scranton (1838–1908), congressman
 Streeter Seidell, comedian, writer, actor, and TV host
 Edgar Snow, journalist, author, and Cold War-era China expert
 Karlheinz Stockhausen, German composer
 Grover Whalen, politician and public relations professional known as "Mr. New York"
 John Willard, U.S. Marshal for Vermont, husband of Emma Willard
 Wheeler Williams (1897–1972), sculptor
 Laurence Witten, antiquarian collector and dealer who sold the Vinland map—later found to be a forgery—to Yale University

Sister cities
 Madison, New Jersey, United States

References

External links

Madison Chamber of Commerce

 
Towns in New Haven County, Connecticut
Towns in the New York metropolitan area
Towns in Connecticut
Populated coastal places in Connecticut